Mok Cheuk Wing (born 2 February 1949) is a Hong Kong judoka. He competed at the 1972 Summer Olympics and the 1976 Summer Olympics.

References

External links
 
Photos of Mok and other Hong Kong judoka in 1982 on the page of the Kowloon Judo Club

1949 births
Living people
Hong Kong male judoka
Olympic judoka of Hong Kong
Judoka at the 1972 Summer Olympics
Judoka at the 1976 Summer Olympics
Place of birth missing (living people)